Pimelea eyrei is a species of flowering plant in the family Thymelaeaceae and is endemic to the southwest of Western Australia. It is an erect shrub with hairy, narrowly elliptic leaves and clusters of densely hairy, white or cream-coloured flowers.

Description
Flowering occurs from August to November.

Taxonomy
Pimelea eyrei was first formally described in 1866 by Ferdinand von Mueller in Fragmenta Phytographiae Australiae from specimens collected by George Maxwell. The specific epithet (eyrei) honours the explorer Edward John Eyre. In 1988, Barbara Lynette Rye reduced P. eyrei to a subspecies of P. longiflora, but the change is not accepted by the Australian Plant Census.

Distribution and habitat
This pimelea grows in shrubland between the Bremer River and Hamersley Inlet in the Fitzgerald River National Park in south-western Western Australia.

Conservation status
Pimelea eyrei is listed as "Priority Two" by the Western Australian Government Department of Biodiversity, Conservation and Attractions, meaning that it is poorly known and from only one or a few locations.

References

eyrei
Malvales of Australia
Flora of Western Australia
Plants described in 1866
Taxa named by Ferdinand von Mueller